III. (pronounced Tringle) is a three song extended play (EP) by American singer JoJo. Tringle consists of three songs: "When Love Hurts",  "Save My Soul" and "Say Love". The singles premiered on JoJo's official SoundCloud page on August 20, 2015 and was released officially on August 21, 2015 to all digital retailers ahead of her upcoming third studio album Mad Love.

Promotion
Prior to the release, JoJo performed "When Love Hurts" and "Say Love" for the first time live at iHeartMedia on August 6, 2015, and has scheduled intimate performances attended by her fans before the official release of the tringle. She has since been performing at several clubs and has attended many interviews with Teen Vogue, Jezebel, MTV, VH1, Time and Billboard, among others.

Singles
"When Love Hurts" officially impacted on Mainstream radio in the U.S. on November 17, 2015 as the EP's lead single.

Music videos 
JoJo released a music video for the track "When Love Hurts" on September 28, 2015, via MTV. JoJo released the music video for "Say Love" on October 27, 2015.  The music video for "Save My Soul" was released on January 8, 2016.

Tour

On October 5, 2015 JoJo announced her second major nationwide tour entitled The "I Am JoJo Tour" via her official Twitter page.[5] The tour will visit 23 cities all across North America beginning on November 2 at Minneapolis’ Triple Rock Social Club and runs through the end of the year, wrapping up on JoJo's 25th Birthday on December 20 at the Hi Ho Lounge in New Orleans.

Critical reception
III received positive reviews from music critics. SoSo Gay said that it was "A typically A-grade set of material from one of this generation’s most talented singers and songwriters. III is a highly accomplished set of songs that bode well for the inevitable new studio album."

Track listing

Charts

Release history

References

2015 EPs
JoJo (singer) albums
Atlantic Records EPs
Albums produced by Jason Evigan